John Naisbitt (January 15, 1929 – April 8, 2021) was an American author and public speaker in the area of futures studies. His first book Megatrends: Ten New Directions Transforming Our Lives was published in 1982. It was the result of almost ten years of research. It was on The New York Times Best Seller List for two years, mostly as No. 1. Megatrends was published in 57 countries and sold more than 14 million copies.

Biography
John Naisbitt grew up in Glenwood, Utah and studied at Harvard, Cornell and Utah universities. He gained business experience working for IBM and Eastman Kodak. In the world of politics he was assistant to the Commissioner of Education under President John F. Kennedy and served as special assistant to HEW Secretary John Gardner during the Johnson administration. He left Washington in 1966 and joined Science Research Associates. In 1968 he founded his own company, the Urban Research Corporation. Naisbitt founded the Naisbitt China Institute, a non-profit, independent research institution studying the social, cultural and economic transformation of China located at Tianjin University. In 2009, Naisbitt published China's Megatrends, a book analyzing China's rise. He has been an adviser on agricultural development to the royal government of Thailand, former visiting fellow at Harvard University, visiting professor at Moscow State University, faculty member at Nanjing University in China, distinguished International Fellow at the Institute of Strategic and International Studies, Malaysia (the first non-Asian to hold this appointment), professor at Nankai University, Tianjin University of Finance and Economics, and a member of the advisory Board of the Asia Business School, Tianjin, and has been the recipient of 15 honorary doctorates in the humanities, technology and science. John Naisbitt and his wife Doris were based in Vienna and Tianjin.

Naisbitt died on April 8, 2021, at his secondary residence in Velden am Wörther See, Austria.

Impact

On futurists
Naisbitt has had a profound influence on leading modern-day futurists, such as David Houle and others.

On social and political thought
Although Naisbitt has not written an explicitly political book, Megatrends expressed early enthusiasm for radical centrist politics. The book states, in bolded type, "The political left and right are dead; all the action is being generated by a radical center."

Bibliography
 Megatrends: Ten New Directions Transforming Our Lives. Warner Books, 1982
 (with Patricia Aburdene) Reinventing the Corporation: Transforming Your Job and Your Company for the New Information Society. Warner Books, 1985
 (with Patricia Aburdene) Megatrends 2000: Ten New Directions for the 1990s. William & Morrow Company, Inc., 1990
 Global Paradox: The Bigger the World Economy, the More Powerful Its Smallest Players. William Morrow & Company, Inc., 1994
 Megatrends Asia: Eight Asian Megatrends That Are Reshaping Our World. Simon & Schuster, 1996
 High Tech High Touch: Technology and Our Accelerated Search for Meaning. Broadway Books, 1999
 Mind Set!: Reset Your Thinking and See the Future. Collins, 2006.
 China's Megatrends: The 8 Pillars of a New Society. HarperCollins, 2010.

References

External links
 official website
 Naisbitt China Institute
 USA Today: "Naisbitt turns lust for life into mega book career"
 

1929 births
2021 deaths
20th-century American male writers
20th-century American non-fiction writers
21st-century American male writers
21st-century American non-fiction writers
American business writers
American expatriates in Austria
American expatriates in China
American technology writers
Cornell University alumni
Futurologists
Harvard University alumni
Academic staff of Moscow State University
People from Glenwood, Utah
Radical centrist writers
University of Utah alumni
Writers from Salt Lake City